The Municipality of Gorje is a municipality in Slovenia. It was established in 2006 and came into existence on 1 January 2007, when it split from the Municipality of Bled.

Settlements
In addition to the municipal seat of Zgornje Gorje, the municipality also includes the following settlements:

 Grabče
 Krnica
 Mevkuž
 Perniki
 Podhom
 Poljšica pri Gorjah
 Radovna
 Spodnje Gorje
 Spodnje Laze
 Višelnica
 Zgornje Laze

References

External links

Municipality of Gorje on Geopedia
Municipal website

 
Gorje
2006 establishments in Slovenia